Laurence Nicholas Nabholtz (February 18, 1901 – October 2, 1987) was an American professional golfer. He reached the semi-final of the 1924 PGA Championship losing by 1 hole to Jim Barnes. He won the El Paso Open in January 1928.

Professional wins (2)
1925 Ohio Open
1928 El Paso Open (PGA Tour)

Results in major championships

WD = withdrew
CUT = missed the half-way cut
R64, R32, R16, QF, SF = round in which player lost in PGA Championship match play
"T" indicates a tie for a place

References

American male golfers
Golfers from Pennsylvania
People from Sharon, Pennsylvania
1901 births
1987 deaths